Boris Alexis Rieloff Venegas (born 8 January 1984) is a Chilean former footballer who played as a right back.

He arrived to Audax Italiano in 1993 when he was nine. After being promoted to the first team in 2004, he remained in the club until 2010 season when he was 26. His good performances under the coach Raúl Toro Fuenzalida during 2006 and 2007 seasons made his services as a right back a great value, factors that, first, catapulted his arrival to Argentine football and later sealed his arrival at Colo-Colo (2011–2013), Chilean powerhouse team.

His performance in Audax in 2006 allowed him being called up to the Chilean football team (between that season and 2007), team which in that time was in a slow process of change that included a temporary period between 1998 FIFA World Cup and 2010 FIFA World Cup. Although the prolongation of Rieloff's good performance allowed him to be summoned by Nelson Acosta to 2007 Copa América, later he was not called up by Marcelo Bielsa during qualifiers road to South Africa (2007–2009) considering that he didn't play with right wings and in this position he commonly adapted to Mauricio Isla as a right midfielder, who had to Hugo Droguett or Gonzalo Fierro as substitutes.

After 2008, the decline of Audax in the national concert —in comparison with his previous campaigns— was eclipsing his showy game and projections that he achieved in Toro's team (who was fired by the club's board in November of that year). Despite his good game in the brief revaluation of Audax through the 2010 annual championship (where they achieved a third place), later he didn't manage to have regularity either in his time at Gimnasia y Esgrima de La Plata or in Colo-Colo, institution of unstable seasons during the 2011–2013 period.

Club career
Rieloff began his career at Audax Italiano football academy for then be promoted to the first-adult team in 2004. After playing six seasons at the Italic club he did not renew his contract in December 2010, so Audax board honored him for his years playing at Estadio Bicentenario de La Florida during a game with Unión Española.

After his departure, was heavy linked with Universidad de Chile and Colo-Colo, but he refused them for an alleged offer from Argentina. Finally, on 15 January 2011, Rieloff was presented at Argentine Primera División side Gimnasia La Plata as club’s new signing, which he reached a six-month deal.

Honours

Individual
 El Gráfico’s League Season Team: 2007, 2010
 ANFP Golden Ball League Season Team: 2010

Notes

References

External links
 
 
 

1984 births
Living people
Footballers from Santiago
Chilean footballers
Chilean expatriate footballers
Chile international footballers
Audax Italiano footballers
Club de Gimnasia y Esgrima La Plata footballers
Colo-Colo footballers
Deportes Iquique footballers
Colo-Colo B footballers
Ñublense footballers
Deportes Melipilla footballers
Chilean Primera División players
Argentine Primera División players
Segunda División Profesional de Chile players
Primera B de Chile players
Chilean expatriate sportspeople in Argentina
Expatriate footballers in Argentina
Association football defenders